Reginald Karori Henry Johansson (27 November 1925 – 20 June 2007) was a New Zealand field hockey player. He represented New Zealand in field hockey between 1950 and 1956, including at the 1956 Olympic Games in Melbourne.

References

External links

1925 births
2007 deaths
Field hockey players from Wellington City
New Zealand male field hockey players
Olympic field hockey players of New Zealand
Field hockey players at the 1956 Summer Olympics
20th-century New Zealand people
21st-century New Zealand people